Fausto Zapata Loredo (18 December 1940 – 15 December 2014) was a Mexican lawyer, politician, diplomat, journalist and television presenter. He briefly served as Governor of San Luis Potosí from September to October 1991, after he was forced to resign due to a fraud conflict with Salvador Nava. He previously served as member of the Senate (1976–1982) and the Chamber of Deputies (1967–1970).

After retiring from politics he served as diplomat in different posts, including as Ambassador to Italy (1977), Malta (1977), China (1987), North Korea (1987) and as Consul to Los Angeles (1992) and New York (1993).

Since 2005 he anchored Diálogos Políticos, a political analysis and commentary program in Televisión Mexiquense. Zapata died due to cancer on 15 December 2014.

Honours
Great Britain, Knight Commander of The Royal Victorian Order
France, Grand Officier de l’Ordre National Du Mérite
Italy, Gran Croce
Germany, Order of Merit Mérito: Great Cross
Japan, Order of the Rising Sun
Austria, Order of Merit: Grand Official
Brazil, Order Nacional del Cruzeiro Du Sul: Gran Cruz
Venezuela, Order Francisco de Miranda: Primera Clase and Orden del Libertador: Gran Oficial
Jordan, Order al-Istiglal
Egypt, Order of Merit, Gran Oficial

References

1940 births
2014 deaths
Governors of San Luis Potosí
Members of the Senate of the Republic (Mexico)
Members of the Chamber of Deputies (Mexico)
Ambassadors of Mexico to Italy
Ambassadors of Mexico to Malta
Ambassadors of Mexico to China
Recipients of the Order of the Rising Sun
Mexican journalists
Male journalists
20th-century Mexican lawyers
Institutional Revolutionary Party politicians
People from San Luis Potosí
Deaths from cancer in Mexico
Mexican television presenters